Nizhneivkino is an urban locality (an urban-type settlement) in Kumyonsky District of Kirov Oblast, Russia. Population:

References

Urban-type settlements in Kirov Oblast